The Niederösterreichische Escompte-Gesellschaft or Niederösterreichischen Escomptegesellschaft was a significant Austrian bank, created in Vienna in 1853. In 1934, the sounder parts of its business were merged with Creditanstalt and Wiener Bankverein to form Creditanstalt-Bankverein, a predecessor entity of Bank Austria (since 2005 part of UniCredit).

History

The Niederösterreichische Escompte-Gesellschaft was formed in 1853 on the model of the Disconto-Gesellschaft established two years earlier in Berlin, and mainly served merchants and industrialists in Vienna and its surrounding region of Lower Austria. In 1863, it sponsored the creation of the Böhmische Escompte-Bank in Prague, of which it eventually took full ownership in 1901. By 1910, it was one of the seven largest banks in Vienna.

Following World War I, in 1919 the Niederösterreichische Escompte-Gesellschaft had to sell the Böhmische Escompte-Bank to Prague-based Živnostenská banka under the newly established Czechoslovakian government's policy of reducing foreign control of its banking system, or nostrification. In 1927, it took a 6 percent ownership stake in Bank Handlowy in Warsaw.

The Niederösterreichische Escompte-Gesellschaft was weakened by the Austrian banking crisis of the early 1930s. In 1934, its viable operations were merged with its Vienna-based peers, Creditanstalt and Wiener Bankverein, as part of the major financial restructuring engineered by chancellor Engelbert Dollfuss. The remaining assets and liabilities were managed as a bad bank by the Oesterreichische Nationalbank under the name , and eventually liquidated.

Headquarters

The Niederösterreichischen Escompte-Gesellschaft originally purchased propertes prominently located on Vienna's Freyung square, namely the houses Zum goldenen Straußen (Freyung 8) and Zum rothen Mandl (Freyung 9). It had a new building erected there in 1871 after tearing down the two houses.

In the early 1910s, it purchased a property on the nearby Am Hof square, number 2, that was the former location of Austria's Imperial War Council or Hofkriegsrat (known since 1848 as the Ministry of War), and before that of Vienna's Jesuit professed house of which the nearby  remains. The Niederösterreichischen Escompte-Gesellschaft sold its Freyung property in 1914 to the Creditanstalt, which used to expand its own headquarters from across the  street.

By coincidence, therefore, the same architects had near-simultaneously designed the seats of the three large banks that merged in 1934, after which the merged Creditanstalt-Bankverein settled in the former Bankverein head office.

Following the 1934 merger, the former Niederösterreichischen Escompte-Gesellschaft building on am Hof 2 was purchased in 1938 at the occasion of the merger between Länderbank and Mercurbank, engineered by Mercurbank's owner Dresdner Bank following the Anschluss, and became the merged entity's head office. In 1991, it became the seat of newly formed Bank Austria after Länderbank merged with Vienna's Zentralsparkasse. In 1997, Bank Austria purchased Creditanstalt and eventually merged with it in 2002, subsequently moving into the former Creditanstalt-Bankverein head office building at Schottentor. Financier René Benko purchased the property on am Hof 2 in 2008 and repurposed it after renovation into a luxury hotel, despite a fire in 2011. The hotel opened in 2014 as Vienna's Park Hyatt.

See also
 Anglo-Austrian Bank
 Länderbank

Notes

1853 establishments in the Austrian Empire
Banks established in 1853
Defunct banks of Austria